Antonio Giel (born November 20, 1981), known as Antonio, is an Aruban footballer who plays as a GoalkeeperMidfielder for Aruban Division di Honor club Nacional and a former member of the Aruba national team. He made a single appearance for the Aruba national team in 2008.

Honours
Nacional
Aruban Division di Honor: 2003–04, 2006–07, 2016–17

National team statistics

References

1981 births
Living people
Aruban footballers
Association football goalkeepers
SV Deportivo Nacional players
Aruba international footballers